Matuguta is a settlement in Kenya's most Central Province.

References 

Populated places in Central Province (Kenya)